Balzan is a small village in Malta.

Balzan  may also refer to: 

 Balzan Prize, an award for outstanding achievements in the fields of humanities, natural sciences, culture, as well as for endeavours for peace and the brotherhood of man
 Balzan Of The Cat People, a short lived series of three books by Gerard F. Conway, writing as Wallace Moore

People
 Alessandro Balzan (born 1980), Italian auto racing driver
 Maximilian Balzan (1637–1711), Maltese mediaeval philosopher

See also
 Balsan (disambiguation)